This article details the Huddersfield Giants's rugby league football club's 2020 season.

Fixtures and results 
  

All fixtures are subject to change

Challenge Cup

Regular season

League standings

Player statistics

As of Round 5  (1 March 2020)

2020 squad

2020 transfers

Gains

Losses

Notes

References

External links
 

Huddersfield Giants seasons
Super League XXV by club